NGMA may refer to:

 National Gallery of Modern Art in New Delhi, India, or one of its branches:
 National Gallery of Modern Art, Bangalore
 National Gallery of Modern Art, Mumbai
 National Grants Management Association

Or an acronym standing for "Next Generation MicroArchitecture" for CPU:
 Intel "Next Generation Microarchitecture", once a reference to Core microarchitecture
 AMD Next Generation Microarchitecture (disambiguation)